The Ministry of Development of Greece was created in January 1996 by then Prime Minister Costas Simitis through the merger of three former ministries: the Ministry of Industry, Energy and Technology, the Ministry of Commerce and the Ministry of Tourism). The Ministry of Development was abolished after the 2009 election and its role taken over by the Ministry of the Economy, Competitiveness and Shipping and later by the newly established Ministry of Development and Investment.

List of Ministers for Development

See also
Cabinet of Greece

External links
Ministry website (archived)

Defunct government ministries of Greece
Lists of government ministers of Greece
Ministries established in 1996